Kamil Abdulbariyevich Ferkhanov (5 September 1964 – 17 June 2021) was a Russian professional footballer who played as a forward or midfielder.

Career
Ferkhanov played five seasons in the Soviet First League with FC Pamir Dushanbe. He died of a heart attack on 17 June 2021 at the age of 56, while playing in a football game in Avangard Stadium, Ulyanovsk.

Honours
 Russian Third League Zone 4 top scorer: 1995 (11 goals).

References

External links
 

1964 births
2021 deaths
Sportspeople from Dushanbe
Soviet footballers
Association football forwards
Russian footballers
CSKA Pamir Dushanbe players
FC Iskra Smolensk players
Russian expatriate footballers
Russian expatriate sportspeople in Finland
Expatriate footballers in Finland
FC Volga Ulyanovsk players
GBK Kokkola players